The General Junta of the Principality of Asturias (in Spanish: Junta General del Principado de Asturias, in Asturian: Xunta Xeneral del Principáu d'Asturies) is the parliament of Asturias, an autonomous community of Spain. Its Statute of Autonomy, the basic organic law of the community, defines it as the supreme institution of representation of the Asturian people.

Established in 1982, it has the name of an Asturian political institution that existed from the Middle Ages to the 19th century. The General Junta exercises the legislative power, approves the budgets of the community, and guides and controls the action of the Council of Government, the executive power, whose leader it elects as the "President of the Principality of Asturias". It also exercises all competences conferred or devolved to the autonomous communities in the Constitution of Spain and assumed by the community itself in its Statute of Autonomy and any other relevant law.

The General Junta is integrated by 45 members called "deputies" (in Spanish: diputados) for a period of four years unless it is dissolved by the President of the Principality, who then calls for new elections. The General Junta meets at the Regional Palace in Oviedo.

Election
The election is in three electoral districts. 34 members are returned for the Central district, which contains Avilés, Gijón and Oviedo, the three largest municipalities, and in total represents 888,293 people in 2010. Six members are returned for the Western district (121,903 people) and five for the Eastern district (73,511 people). A threshold of the 3% is established for having any seats.

Presidents of the General Junta 

The President of the General Junta of the Principality of Asturias is the presiding officer of that legislature.

Sources
Official website
All members of the General Junta

 
1982 establishments in Asturias
Asturias
Asturias